Kot Aalam, Kot Almo or Kot Aalmoon is a small village in Taluka Sujawal, Thatta District, in the Pakistani state of Sindh, situated on the left bank of the Indus River. In 1858 it was district of Sindh province (see the book Tareekh e Sujawal). It is situated 8 km north from Daro city. After the floods of August 2010 many Memon families have migrated to other cities of Sindh, Specially Karachi, Daro, Mirpur Bathoro, Thatta and Tandojam.

History
This village has an ancient history. It was an Islamic center, a town of Thatta. Its inhabitants were Muslims, including some scholars who used to work as farmers for survival. 
In the British era (1857) the village was a district of Sindh.
It was damaged three times due to river floods and time to time its position was moved from one place to another. The most recent flood destroyed the village completely during August-2010.

Location
Presently it is a Deh of Union Council Bijora, Taluka Sujawal District Thatta Now it is in District Sujawal, Sindh, Pakistan, located at  about 20 km north of Sujawal and 8 km north-west of Darro town.

Agriculture
It is an agricultural area close to Pinnah forest on the left bank of Rajwah tributary supplied by Penjary canal of Ghulam Muhammad (Kotri) barrage, Hyderabad Sindh. A Surjani Loop (SL) Bacha Band separated irrigated and flood areas.

Inhabitants
The inhabitants consist of Sayyed, Memon, Mirbhar, Solangi and Khaskheli families including adjacent villages. The village has been destroyed nine times in floods. The inhabitants had stayed here time to time, the inhabitants are poor mostly farmers and labourers. Rice, wheat and sugarcane are the main crops during both cropping seasons (Kharif and Rabi). An acute shortage of irrigation water throughout the year annually produce poor yields per unit area.

https://plus.google.com/u/0/?tab=XX

References

Villages in Sindh
Thatta District